The  is one of five active Armies of the Japan Ground Self-Defense Force headquartered in Sendai, Miyagi Prefecture. Its responsibility is the defense of the Tōhoku region.

Organization 
  North Eastern Army, in Sendai
  6th Division, in Higashine, responsible for the defense of Fukushima, Miyagi and Yamagata prefectures.
  9th Division, in Aomori, responsible for the defense of Akita, Aomori and Iwate prefectures.
 2nd Engineer Brigade, in Shibata
 10th Engineer Group (Construction), in Shibata
 11th Engineer Group (Construction), in Fukushima
 104th Equipment Company, in Shibata
 312th Vehicle Company, in Shibata
 North Eastern Army Combined (Training) Brigade, in Sendai
 38th Infantry Regiment, in Tagajō
 2nd Basic Training Battalion, in Sendai
 119th Training Battalion, in Tagajō
 North Eastern Army Artillery Unit, in Sendai
 4th Surface-to-Surface Missile Regiment, at Camp Hachinohe, in Hachinohe (Type 88 Surface-to-Ship Missile)
 304th Observation Battery, in Sendai
 101st Anti-Aircraft Artillery Group, at Camp Hachinohe, in Hachinohe (MIM-23 Hawk)
 North Eastern Army Signal Group, in Sendai
 North Eastern Army Aviation Group, in Sendai
 2nd Anti-tank Helicopter Battalion, at Camp Hachinohe, in Hachinohe
 North Eastern Army Helicopter Battalion, in Sendai
 North Eastern Army Meteorological Company, in Sendai
 Logistic Support Battalion, in Sendai
 North Eastern Army Logistic Support, in Sendai
 North Eastern Army Finance Service, in Sendai
 North Eastern Army Command Post Training Support, in Sendai
 North Eastern Army Military Intelligence, in Sendai
 North Eastern Army Band, in Sendai
 North Eastern Army Medical Service, in Sendai
 Tōhoku Logistic Depot, in Sendai

External links 
 North Eastern Army Homepage (Japanese)

Armies of the Japan Ground Self-Defense Force
Military units and formations established in 1960